Seaca de Câmp is a commune in Dolj County, Oltenia, Romania with a population of 2,550 people. It is composed of two villages, Piscu Nou and Seaca de Câmp.

References

Communes in Dolj County
Localities in Oltenia